Chris Baker is a former talk radio host who has worked in Minneapolis, Houston and Omaha.

Baker grew up in Dallas. He worked in St. Louis, then moved to Houston where he worked until his show was canceled in 2007.

In 2006, the Houston Press wrote of Baker, “Chris Baker is the leading local talk-show host in town; since the town in question is Houston.” He was a 2008 nominee for the Texas Radio Hall of Fame. Described by critics as working in “shock-jockery”, Baker has drawn criticism for remarks about Magic Johnson, Barack Obama, the WBNA, gay people, women, and transgender people. Following the 2008 comments about Johnson, his station at the time, KTLK in Minneapolis, offered regrets for the remarks and aired public service announcements about HIV/AIDS. On April 21, 2021, Baker was fired as the afternoon talk host on NewsRadio 1110 KFAB in Omaha, Nebraska after making a racist tweet following the conviction of Derek Chauvin, to which he responded that he had accidentally posted the wrong photo.

Baker is also a standup comedian.

References

American male comedians
21st-century American comedians
Place of birth missing (living people)
American talk radio hosts
Year of birth missing (living people)
Living people